Phyllobrostis jedmella is a moth in the  family Lyonetiidae. It is found in Algeria and Spain.

The wingspan is 5.5–6 mm. Adults are on wing in April.

The larvae feed on Thymelaea microphylla. They may mine the leaves of their host plant, but primarily feed on the female flowers. When these are unavailable, leaves are completely mined out. Pupation takes place in a white cocoon between leaves and on the twigs.

External links
Revision of the genus Phyllobrostis Staudinger, 1859 (Lepidoptera, Lyonetiidae)
bladmineerders.nl

References

Lyonetiidae
Moths described in 1907